In botany, succulent plants, also known as succulents, are plants with parts that are thickened, fleshy, and engorged, usually to retain water in arid climates or soil conditions. The word succulent comes from the Latin word sucus, meaning "juice" or "sap".

Succulent plants may store water in various structures, such as leaves and stems. The water content of some succulent organs can get up to 90–95%, such as Glottiphyllum semicyllindricum and Mesembryanthemum barkleyii. Some definitions also include roots, thus geophytes that survive unfavorable periods by dying back to underground storage organs may be regarded as succulents. The habitats of these water-preserving plants are often in areas with high temperatures and low rainfall, such as deserts, but succulents may be found even in alpine ecosystems growing in rocky soil. Succulents are characterized by their ability to thrive on limited water sources, such as mist and dew, which makes them equipped to survive in an ecosystem that contains scarce water sources.

Succulents are not a taxonomic category, since the term describes only the attributes of a particular species; some species in a genus (such as Euphorbia spp) or family (such as Asphodelaceae) may be succulent, whereas others are less so or not at all. Many plant families have multiple succulent species found within them (more than 25 plant families). In some families, such as Aizoaceae, Cactaceae, and Crassulaceae, most species are succulents. In horticultural use, the term is sometimes used in a way that excludes plants that botanists would regard as succulents, such as cacti. Succulents are often grown as ornamental plants because of their striking and unusual appearance, as well as their ability to thrive with relatively minimal care.

Definition
By definition, succulent plants are drought-resistant plants in which the leaves, stem, or roots have become more than usually fleshy by the development of water-storing tissue. Other sources exclude roots as in the definition "a plant with thick, fleshy and swollen stems and/or leaves, adapted to dry environments". The difference affects the relationship between succulents and "geophytes"–plants that survive unfavorable seasons as a resting bud on an underground organ. The underground organs, such as bulbs, corms, and tubers, are often fleshy with water-storing tissues. Thus, if roots are included in the definition, many geophytes would be classed as succulents. Plants adapted to living in dry environments such as succulents, are termed xerophytes. However, not all xerophytes are succulents, since there are other ways of adapting to a shortage of water, e.g., by developing small leaves which may roll up or having leathery rather than succulent leaves. Nor are all succulents xerophytes, as plants such as Crassula helmsii are both succulent and aquatic.

Some who grow succulents as a hobby may use the term in a different way from botanists. In horticultural use, the term succulent regularly excludes cacti. For example, Jacobsen's three volume Handbook of Succulent Plants does not include cacti. Many books covering the cultivation of these plants include "cacti and succulents" as the title or part of the title. However, in botanical terminology, cacti are succulents, but not the reverse as many succulent plants are not cacti. Cacti form a monophyletic group and apart from one species are native only to the New World (the Americas), but through parallel evolution similar looking plants in completely different families like the Apocynaceae evolved in the Old World.

A further difficulty for general identification is that plant families are neither succulent nor non-succulent and can contain both. In many genera and families, there is a continuous gradation from plants with thin leaves and normal stems to those with very clearly thickened and fleshy leaves or stems. The succulent characteristic becomes meaningless for dividing plants into genera and families. Different sources may classify the same species differently.

Horticulturists often follow commercial conventions and may exclude other groups of plants such as bromeliads, that scientifically are considered succulents. A practical horticultural definition has become "a succulent plant is any desert plant that a succulent plant collector wishes to grow", without any consideration of scientific classifications. Commercial presentations of "succulent" plants will present those that customers commonly identify as such. Plants offered commercially then as "succulents" (such as hen and chicks), will less often include geophytes (in which the swollen storage organ is wholly underground), but will include plants with a caudex, that is a swollen above-ground organ at soil level, formed from a stem, a root, or both.

Appearance

The storage of water often gives succulent plants a more swollen or fleshy appearance than other plants, a characteristic known as succulence. In addition to succulence, succulent plants variously have other water-saving features. These may include:

 crassulacean acid metabolism (CAM) to minimize water loss
 absent, reduced, or cylindrical-to-spherical leaves
 reduction in the number of stomata
 stems as the main site of photosynthesis, rather than leaves
 compact, reduced, cushion-like, columnar, or spherical growth form
 ribs enabling rapid increases in plant volume and decreasing surface area exposed to the sun
 waxy, hairy, or spiny outer surface to create a humid micro-habitat around the plant, which reduces air movement near the surface of the plant, and thereby reduces water loss and may create shade
 roots very near the surface of the soil, so they are able to take up moisture from very small showers or even from heavy dew
 ability to remain plump and full of water even with high internal temperatures (e.g.)
 very impervious outer cuticle (skin)
fast wound sealing and healing 
 mucilaginous substances, which retain water abundantly

Habitat

Other than in Antarctica, succulents can be found within each continent. According to the World Wildlife Fund, South Africa is home to around a third of all succulent species, most residing in the succulent Karoo biome. While it is often thought that most succulents come from dry areas such as steppes, semi-desert, and desert, the world's driest areas do not make for proper succulent habitats, mainly due to the difficulty such low growing plants or seedlings would have to thrive in environments where they could easily be covered by sand. Australia, the world's driest inhabited continent, hosts very few native succulents due to the frequent and prolonged droughts. Even Africa, the continent with the most native succulents, does not host many of the plants in its most dry regions. However, while succulents are unable to grow in these harshest of conditions, they are able to grow in conditions that are uninhabitable by other plants. In fact, many succulents are able to thrive in dry conditions, and some are able to last up to two years without water depending on their surroundings and adaptations. Occasionally, succulents may occur as epiphytes, growing on other plants with limited or no contact with the ground, and being dependent on their ability to store water and gaining nutrients by other means; it is seen in Tillandsia. Succulents also occur as inhabitants of sea coasts and dry lakes, which are exposed to high levels of dissolved minerals that are deadly to many other plant species. California is home to close to hundred succulent species that are native to the state, many of them live in coastal environments. Potted succulents are able to grow in most indoor environments with minimal care.

Conservation 
In South Africa, several species have been threatened with extinction due to poaching from the wild for the black market and mining related activities. The plants are mainly sold to collectors in Asian countries, where there has been a high demand for them. It is illegal since 1974 to be in possession of protected succulents such as the Conophytum without authorisation in the Western Cape and Northern Cape, the two South African provinces where they grow.

Families and genera

There are approximately sixty different plant families that contain succulents.
Plant orders, families, and genera in which succulent species occur are listed below.

Order Alismatales

 Araceae: Zamioculcas

Order Apiales

 Apiaceae: Azorella, Crithmum
 Araliaceae: Cussonia
Order Arecales (also called Principes)
 Arecaceae (also called Palmae) Jubaea

Order Asparagales

 Amaryllidaceae (geophytes): Amaryllis, Boophone, Clivia, Crinum, Cryptostephanus, Cyrtanthus, Haemanthus, Rauhia, Scadoxus, Stenomesson
 Asparagaceae
 Agavoideae: Agave, Beschorneria, Furcraea, Hesperaloe, Hesperoyucca, Manfreda, Polianthes, Yucca
 Lomandroideae: Cordyline
 Nolinoideae: Beaucarnea, Calibanus, Dasylirion, Dracaena, Nolina
 Scilloideae (Hyacinthaceae): Albuca, Bowiea, Daubenya, Drimia, Eucomis, Lachenalia, Ledebouria, Massonia, Ornithogalum, Scilla, Urginea, Veltheimia
 Doryanthaceae: Doryanthes
 Orchidaceae: Acampe, Aerangis, Ansellia, Bolusiella, Bulbophyllum, Cirrhopetalum, Calanthe, Cyrtorchis, Dendrobium cucumerinum, Eulophia, Liparis, Oberonia, Oeceoclades, Polystachya, Tridactyle, Vanilla
Asphodelaceae
 subfamily Asphodeloideae: Aloe (succulents and succulent geophytes), Astroloba, Tulista, × Astrolista, Bulbine (succulent geophytes, succulents, and geophytes), Bulbinella (geophyte), Chortolirion (succulent geophytes), Gasteria, Gonialoe, Haworthia, Trachyandra (succulent geophytes and succulents),
 subfamily Xanothorrhoeoidae: Xanthorrhoea

Order Asterales

 Asteraceae: Arctotheca, Baeriopsis, Chrysanthemoides, Coulterella, Crassocephalum, Curio, Delairea, Didelta, Emilia, Eremothamnus, Gymnodiscus, Gynura, Hillardiella (geophyte), Lopholaena, Monoculus, Nidorella, Osteospermum, Othonna (succulents and succulent geophytes), Phaneroglossa, Poecilolepis, Polyachyrus, Pteronia, Senecio, Solanecio, Tripteris
 Campanulaceae: Brighamia

Order Brassicales

 Brassicaceae: Heliophila, Lepidium
 Capparidaceae: Maerua
 Caricaceae: Carica, Jacarathia
 Moringaceae: Moringa

Order Caryophyllales

 Aizoaceae: Corbichonia, Gisekia, Herreanthus, Limeum, Ophthalmophyllum, Saphesia
 subfamily Aizooideae: Acrosanthes, Aizoanthemum, Aizoon, Galenia, Gunniopsis, Plinthus, Tetragonia
 subfamily Mesembryanthemoideae (syn. Mesembryanthemaceae): Aptenia, Aridaria, Aspazoma, Brownanthus, Calamophyllum, Caulipsilon, Conophytum, Dactylopsis, Erepsia, Hameria, Hartmanthus, Hymenogyne, Marlothistela, Mesembryanthemum, Phiambolia, Phyllobolus, Prenia,  Psilocaulon, Ruschiella, Sarozona,  Synaptophyllum
 subfamily Ruschioideae:
 tribe Apatesieae: Apatesia, Carpanthea, Caryotophora, Conicosia, Hymenogyne, Saphesia, Skiatophytum
 tribe Dorotheantheae: Aethephyllum Cleretum Dorotheanthus
 tribe Ruschiae: Acrodon, Aloinopsis, Amphibolia, Antegibbaeum, Antimima, Arenifera, Argyroderma, Astridia, Bergeranthus, Bijlia, Braunsia, Brianhuntleya, Carpobrotus, Carruanthus, Cephalophyllum, Cerochlamys, Chasmatophyllum, Cheiridopsis, Circandra, Conophytum, Corpuscularia, Cylindrophyllum, Delosperma, Dicrocaulon, Didymaotus, Dinteranthus, Diplosoma, Disphyma, Dracophilus, Drosanthemum, Eberlanzia, Ebracteola, Enarganthe, Erepsia, Esterhuysenia, Faucaria, Fenestraria, Frithia, Gibbaeum, Glottiphyllum, Hallianthus, Hereroa, Ihlenfeldtia, Imitaria, Jacobsenia, Jensenobotrya, Jordaaniella, Juttadinteria, Khadia, Lampranthus, Lapidaria (plant), Leipoldtia, Lithops, Machairophyllum, Malephora, Mestoklema, Meyerophytum, Mitrophyllum, Monilaria, Mossia, Muiria, Namaquanthus, Namibia, Nananthus, Nelia, Neohenricia, Octopoma, Odontophorus, Oophytum, Ophthalmophyllum, Orthopterum, Oscularia, Ottosonderia, Pleiospilos, Polymita, Psammophora, Rabiea, Rhinephyllum, Rhombophyllum, Ruschia, Ruschianthemum, Ruschianthus, Schlechteranthus, Schwantesia, Scopelogena, Smicrostigma, Stayneria, Stoeberia, Stomatium Tanquana Titanopsis, Trichodiadema, Vanheerdea, Vanzijlia, Vlokia, Wooleya, Zeuktophyllum
 subfamily Sesuvioideae: Cypselea, Sesuvium, Trianthema, Tribulocarpus, Zaleya
 Amaranthaceae:
 subfamily Amaranthoideae: Arthraerva
 subfamily Chenopodioideae (family Chenopodiaceae):) Atriplex, Chenopodium, Dissocarpus, Einadia, Enchylaena, Eremophea, Halopeplis, Maireana, Malacocera, Neobassia, Osteocarpum, Rhagodia, Roycea, Halosarcia, Salicornia, Salsola, Sarcocornia, Sclerochlamys, Sclerolaena, Suaeda, Tecticornia, Threlkeldia
 Basellaceae: Anredera, Basella
 Cactaceae: Acanthocalycium, Acanthocereus, Ariocarpus, Armatocereus, Arrojadoa, Arthrocereus, Astrophytum, Austrocactus, Aztekium, Bergerocactus, Blossfeldia, Brachycereus, Browningia, Brasilicereus, Calymmanthium, Carnegiea, Cephalocereus, Cephalocleistocactus, Cereus, Cintia, Cipocereus, Cleistocactus, Coleocephalocereus, Copiapoa, Corryocactus, Coryphantha, Dendrocereus, Denmoza, Discocactus, Disocactus, Echinocactus, Echinocereus, Echinopsis, Epiphyllum, Epithelantha, Eriosyce, Escobaria, Escontria, Espostoa, Espostoopsis, Eulychnia, Facheiroa, Ferocactus, Frailea, Geohintonia, Gymnocalycium, Haageocereus, Harrisia, Hatiora, Hylocereus, Jasminocereus, Lasiocereus, Leocereus, Lepismium, Leptocereus, Leuchtenbergia, Lophophora, Maihuenia, Malacocarpus, Mammillaria, Mammilloydia, Matucana, Melocactus, Micranthocereus, Mila, Monvillea, Myrtillocactus, Neobuxbaumia, Neoraimondia, Neowerdermannia, Obregonia, Opuntia, Cylindropuntia, Oreocereus, Oroya, Ortegocactus, Pachycereus, Parodia, Pediocactus, Pelecyphora, Peniocereus, Pereskia, Pereskiopsis, Pilosocereus, Polaskia, Praecereus, Pseudoacanthocereus, Pseudorhipsalis, Pterocactus, Pygmaeocereus, Quiabentia, Rauhocereus, Rebutia, Rhipsalis, Samaipaticereus, Schlumbergera, Sclerocactus, Selenicereus, Stenocactus, Stenocereus, Stephanocereus, Stetsonia, Strombocactus, Tacinga, Thelocactus, Trichocereus Turbinicarpus, Uebelmannia, Weberbauerocereus, Weberocereus, Yungasocereus
 Didiereaceae: Alluaudia, Alluaudiopsis, Decaria, Didierea
 Molluginaceae: Hypertelis
 Phytolaccaceae: Phytolacca
 Portulacaceae: Amphipetalum, Anacampseros, Avonia, Calyptrotheca, Ceraria, Cistanthe, Calandrinia, Dendroportulaca, Grahamia, Lewisia, Parakeelya, Portulaca, Portulacaria, Schreiteria, Talinella, Talinum

Order Commelinales

 Commelinaceae: Aneilema, Callisia, Cyanotis, Tradescantia, Tripogandra

Order Cornales

 Loasaceae: Schismocarpus

Order Cucurbitales

 Begoniaceae: Begonia
 Cucurbitaceae: Acanthosicyos, Apodanthera, Brandegea, Cephalopentandra, Ceratosanthes, Citrullus, Coccinia, Corallocarpus, Cucumella, Cucumis, Cucurbita, Cyclantheropsis, Dactyliandra, Dendrosicyos, Doyera, Eureindra, Fevillea, Gerrandanthus, Gynostemma, Halosicyos, Ibervilla, Kedostris, Lagenaria, Marah, Momordica, Neoalsomitra, Odosicyos, Parasicyos, Syrigia, Telfairia, Trochomeria, Trochomeriopsis, Tumamoca, Xerosicyos, Zehneria, Zygosicyos

Order Dioscoreales

 Dioscoreaceae: Dioscorea

Order Ericales

 Balsaminaceae: Impatiens
 Ericaceae: Sphyrospermum
 Fouquieriaceae: Fouquieria

Order Fabales

 Fabaceae: Delonix, Dolichos, Erythrina, Lotononis, Lupinus, Neorautanenia, Pachyrhizus, Tylosema
Order Filicales
Polypodiaceae Drymoglossum niphoboloides, Lecanopteris carnosa

Order Gentianales

 Apocynaceae: Adenium, Mandevilla, Pachypodium, Plumeria
 subfamily Asclepiadoideae (syn. Asclepiadaceae): Absolmsia, Australluma, Aspidoglossum, Aspidonepsis, Baynesia, Brachystelma, Ceropegia, Chlorocyathus, Cibirhiza, Cordylogyne, Cynanchum, Dischidia, Dischidiopsis, Duvaliandra, Eustegia, Fanninia, Fockea, Glossostelma, Hoya, Ischnolepis, Lavrania, Marsdenia,  Miraglossum, Odontostelma, Ophionella, Orbeanthus, Pachycarpus, Parapodium, Periglossum, Petopentia, Raphionacme, Riocreuxia, Sarcorrhiza, Schizoglossum, Schlechterella, Stathmostelma, Stenostelma, Stomatostemma, Trachycalymma, Trichocaulon, Tylophora (now in Vincetoxicum), Woodia, Xysmalobium
 tribe Asclepiadeae:
 subtribe Asclepiadne: Asclepias,
 subtribe Gonolobinae: Matelea,
 tribe Maxillarieae:
 subtribe Lycastinae: Rudolfiella
 tribe Stapelieae: Angolluma, Caralluma, Desmidorchis, Duvalia, Echidnopsis, Edithcolea, Frerea, Hoodia, Huernia, Huerniopsis, Larryleachia, Notechidnopsis, Orbea (plant), Orbeopsis, Piaranthus, Pachycymbium, Pectinaria, Pseudolithos, Pseudopectinaria, Quaqua, Rhytidocaulon, Stapelia, Stapelianthus, Stapeliopsis, Tavaresia, Tridentea, Tromotriche, Whitesloanea
 subfamily Periplocoideae:
 tribe Cryptolepideae: Cryptolepis
 Rubiaceae: Anthorrhiza, Anthospermum, Hydnophytum, Hydrophylax, Myrmecodia, Myrmephytum, Phylohydrax, Squamellaria

Order Geraniales

 Geraniaceae: Monsonia, Pelargonium (succulents and geophytes), Sarcocaulon

Order Lamiales

 Gesneriaceae: Aeschynanthus, Alsobia, Chirita, Codonanthe, Columnea, Nematanthus, Sinningia, Streptocarpus
 Lamiaceae: Aeollanthus, Dauphinea, Perrierastrum, Plectranthus, Rotheca, Solenostemon, Tetradenia, Thorncroftia
 Lentibulariaceae
 Pedaliaceae: Holubia, Pterodiscus, Sesamothamnus, Uncarina

Order Malpighiales

 Euphorbiaceae: Cnidoscolus, Euphorbia, Jatropha, Monadenium, Pedilanthus, Phyllanthus, Synadenium
 Passifloraceae: Adenia
 Phyllanthaceae: Phyllanthus

Order Malvales

 Cochlospermaceae
 Malvaceae: Adansonia, Cavanillesia, Ceiba, Pseudobombax
 subgroup Sterculiaceae: Brachychiton, Sterculia

Order Myrtales

 Melastomataceae: Medinilla

Order Oxalidales

 Oxalidaceae (geophytes): Oxalis

Order Piperales

 Piperaceae: Peperomia

Order Poales

 Bromeliaceae: Abromeitiella, Aechmea, Ananas, Catopsis, Connellia, Dyckia, Hechtia, Neoregelia, Puya, Tillandsia, Vriesea
 Poaceae: Dregeochloa, Laobambos

Order Ranunculales

 Menispermaceae: Chasmanthera, Stephania, Tinospora

Order Rosales

 Moraceae: Dorstenia, Ficus
 Urticaceae: Laportea, Obetia, Pilea, Pouzolzia, Sarcopilea

Order Santalales

 Loranthaceae: Actinanthella, Agelanthus, Erianthemum, Helixanthera, Moquiniella, Oncocalyx, Pedistylis, Plicosepalus, Septulina, Tapinanthus, Vanwykia
 Viscaceae (syn. Santalaceae): Viscum

Order Sapindales

 Anacardiaceae: Operculicaria, Pachycormus
 Burseraceae: Boswellia, Bursera, Commiphora
 Meliaceae: Entandrophragma
 Sapindaceae: Erythrophysa

Order Saxifragales

 Crassulaceae: Adromischus, Aeonium, Aichryson, Cotyledon, Crassula, Cremnophila, Dudleya, Echeveria, Graptopetalum, Greenovia, Hylotelephium, Kalanchoe, Kungia, Lenophyllum, Meterostachys, Monanthes, Mucizonia, Orostachys, Pachyphytum, Perrierosedum, Petrosedum, Phedimus, Pistorinia, Prometheum, Pseudosedum, Rhodiola, Rosularia, Sedella, Sedum, Sempervivum, Sinocrassula, Thompsonella, Tylecodon, Umbilicus, Villadia
 Saxifragaceae: Micranthes, Saxifraga

Order Solanales

 Convolvulaceae: Ipomoea, Merremia, Stictocardia, Turbina (plant)
 Solanaceae: Nolana

Order Vitales

 Vitaceae: Cissus, Cyphostemma

Order Zygophyllales

 Zygophyllaceae: Augea, Seetzenia, Zygophyllum

(unplaced order)* Boraginaceae: Heliotropium
(unplaced order)* Icacinaceae: Pyrenacantha (geophyte)

There also were some succulent gymnosperms (but extinct since the end of the Cretaceous):

 Order Pinales

 Cheirolepidiaceae:
Frenelopsis,
Pseudofrenelopsis,
Suturovagina,
Glenrosa

For some families and subfamilies, most members are succulent; for example the Cactaceae, Agavoideae, Aizoaceae, and Crassulaceae.

The table below shows the number of succulent species found in some families and their native habitat:

Cultivation

Succulents are favored as houseplants for their attractiveness and ease of care. They have been cultivated as houseplants since at least the 17th century. If properly potted, succulents require little maintenance to survive indoors. Succulents are very adaptable houseplants and will thrive in a range of indoor conditions. For most plant owners, over-watering and associated infections are the main cause of death in succulents.

Succulents can be propagated by different means. The most common is vegetative propagation; this includes cuttings where several inches of stem with leaves are cut and after healing, produce a callus. After a week or so, roots may grow. A second method is division consisting of uprooting an overgrown clump and pulling the stems and roots apart. A third method is propagation by leaf by allowing the formation of a callus. During this method, a bottom leaf is fully removed from the plant often by twisting or cutting. The leaf then dries out and a callus forms preventing the leaf from absorbing too much moisture and thus rotting. This method typically takes up to a few weeks to produce healthy roots that would eventually create new plants. The vegetative propagation can be different according to the species.

See also
Cactus and Succulent Society of America
 Crassulacean acid metabolism

References

Bibliography
 
 
  (publication date also given as 1930s or 1940s)

External links
Succulent Plants of the World - an iNaturalist Project

 
Plant common names
Plant morphology
Drought-tolerant plants
Garden plants